Lisula Lakshan (born 13 September 1995) is a Sri Lankan cricketer.  He made his first-class debut for Burgher Recreation Club in the 2016–17 Premier League Tournament on 2 December 2016 and his List A debut for Batticaloa District in the 2016–17 Districts One Day Tournament on 15 March 2017. He made his Twenty20 debut for Burgher Recreation Club in the 2017–18 SLC Twenty20 Tournament on 25 February 2018.

References

External links
 

1995 births
Living people
Sri Lankan cricketers
Batticaloa District cricketers
Burgher Recreation Club cricketers
Cricketers from Colombo